Když rozvod, tak rozvod is a Czech comedy film. It was released in 1982.

External links
 

1982 films
1982 comedy films
Czech comedy films
1980s Czech films